Dominique Agostini (born 28 September 1989 in Bastia) is a French former professional footballer who played as a goalkeeper.

Honours
Bastia
Ligue 2: 2011–12
Championnat National: 2010–11

External links
 

1989 births
Living people
Association football goalkeepers
French footballers
Ligue 2 players
SC Bastia players
CA Bastia players
Corsica international footballers
Footballers from Corsica
21st-century French people